Kim Jong-min (born August 11, 1992) is a South Korean footballer who plays for Fagiano Okayama in the J2 League, as a striker.

Career 
Kim signed for Tokushima in January 2011. He made his J.League debut on 26 October 2011, against Consadole Sapporo at Pocarisweat Stadium, coming on as a second-half substitute. He scored his first J.League goal for Tokushima against Giravanz Kitakyushu on 4 March 2012.

References

External links

1992 births
Living people
Association football forwards
South Korean footballers
South Korean expatriate footballers
Tokushima Vortis players
Suwon Samsung Bluewings players
J1 League players
J2 League players
K League 1 players
Expatriate footballers in Japan
South Korean expatriate sportspeople in Japan
Fagiano Okayama players